Movin Subasingha (born 6 July 2000) is a Sri Lankan cricketer. He made his List A debut on 17 December 2019, for Nugegoda Sports and Welfare Club in the 2019–20 Invitation Limited Over Tournament. He made his Twenty20 debut on 6 January 2020, for Nugegoda Sports and Welfare Club in the 2019–20 SLC Twenty20 Tournament. In July 2022, he was signed by the Galle Gladiators for the third edition of the Lanka Premier League.

References

External links
 

2000 births
Living people
Sri Lankan cricketers
Nugegoda Sports and Welfare Club cricketers 
Place of birth missing (living people)